Nguyễn Văn Phan (born 30 June 1929) is a Vietnamese former swimmer. He competed in two events at the 1952 Summer Olympics.

References

External links
 

1929 births
Possibly living people
Vietnamese male swimmers
Olympic swimmers of Vietnam
Swimmers at the 1952 Summer Olympics
Place of birth missing (living people)